The recorded history of education in Taiwan can be traced back to the Dutch colonial period.

Dutch Formosa
In 1636, the Dutch started a school for the Sinckan people that not only featured religious instruction, but also provided schooling in Western literature. Because the Dutch advocated missionary work to be done in the native language, the school was taught in the Sinckan language. The missionary Robertus Junius recorded in his 1643 education report that the Sinckan school had enrolled 80 students, of which 24 were learning to write and 8 to 10 had solid penmanship, while in neighboring Baccaluan (modern-day Anding) school there were 90 students, of which 8 knew how to write.

Aside from proselytizing, the missionaries also compiled dictionaries and books of religious doctrine; they translated Gospel of Matthew into Sinckan and also compiled a vocabulary of Favorlang, another aboriginal language. These would become important sources for later research. The most important Sinckan documents were the contracts between the Sinckan and the Han settlers.

Qing Dynasty
Under Qing dynasty rule, many traditional schools were established, mostly studying Chinese classics such as the teachings of Confucius. Education was limited to the children of well-to-do parents, as public and free schools did not exist. "Even the paid schools limited their instruction to the usual Chinese curriculum, which is devoted first to the study of the characters, and, if a higher education is desired, to the mastering of the Chinese classics...There were none of the studies which in western lands and in Japan are considered necessary for an educated man, and the general tendency of their training was to increase conservatism and love for ancient customs."

Empire of Japan
During the Japanese period school attendance for Taiwanese children increased from 3.8% in 1904 to 71.3% in 1943 and literacy in Taiwan became common.  Modern schools were formed with widespread establishment of primary schools while higher schooling for Taiwanese people remained rare and secondary schools and colleges were mostly for Japanese nationals. In special cases Taiwanese did receive higher schooling and many went to Japan for further studies.

Republic of China
After Taiwan came under control of the Republic of China in 1945, education in Taiwan became a synthesis of the Japanese system and the Chinese system implemented by the Chinese Nationalist government. During the first 20 years of Chinese Nationalist rule, mandatory schooling consisted of six years of primary school education, which was also the length under Japanese rule. In 1968, this was extended to nine years.

After taking control of Taiwan, the Republic of China sought to remodel education on the island, a process that involved politicizing public schools and curtailing private ones. This became more urgent when the ROC and its Nationalist government exiled themselves to the island in 1949 to escape the Chinese Communist Party and the incipient People's Republic of China, which later model its education system aligning with the Soviet Union. Education reassumed a colonial dimension, this time to create a new national identity (a process referred to by Taiwanese scholar Ting-Hong Wong as “national colonialism”). In the late 1950s, the government yielded to pressure from both older Taiwanese communities and recent Mainlander immigrants, and enacted a series of education reforms, including the restoration of private schools (with measures taken to ensure their political loyalty).

See also 
 Education in Taiwan
 Sinkang Manuscripts

Notes

References

External links
 The problems with English teaching in Taiwan
 Education - Reform Fattens Cram School Coffers
 Solutions to Taiwan's Education Woes - The Government: Five Urgent Tasks
 Education Reform - Excellent Teachers Nurture Creative Students
 OECD’s PISA, Media Sensationalism, and Education Reform in Japan
 Taiwan’s vocational education must be reformed
 Five questions on regulating for-profit colleges
 40% of foreign teachers may have fake credentials: report
 Parents' Attitudes toward the English Education Policy in Taiwan